Alain Sarteur (born 17 June 1946 in Plailly, Oise, France) is a French former athlete who competed in the 1972 Summer Olympics.

1972 Olympics
Sarteur participated in the Men's 100 meters.

References

1946 births
Living people
Olympic athletes of France
Athletes (track and field) at the 1972 Summer Olympics
French male sprinters
European Athletics Championships medalists